The 1983 Toronto Blue Jays season was the franchise's seventh season of Major League Baseball. It resulted in the Blue Jays finishing fourth in the American League East with a record of 89 wins and 73 losses. It was the franchise's first winning season, starting a streak of 11 consecutive winning seasons. It was the team's first season to use the song "OK Blue Jays" in the seventh-inning stretch.

Offseason
 December 9, 1982: Dale Murray and Tom Dodd were traded by the Blue Jays to the New York Yankees for Fred McGriff, Dave Collins, Mike Morgan, and cash.
 February 23, 1983: Mickey Klutts was signed as a free agent with the Toronto Blue Jays.

Regular season
 Willie Upshaw became the first Blue Jay to get over 100 RBIs with 104.
 On August 4, 1983, New York Yankee Dave Winfield, while warming up before the 5th inning of a game at Toronto's Exhibition Stadium, accidentally killed a seagull with a thrown ball. He doffed his cap in mock sorrow. Fans responded by hurling obscenities and improvised missiles. After the game, he was brought to the Ontario Provincial Police station on charges of cruelty to animals and was forced to post a $500 bond before being released. Quipped Yankees manager Billy Martin, "It's the first time he's hit the cutoff man." The charges were dropped the following day. For years afterward Winfield's appearances in Toronto were greeted with loud choruses of boos, but he later became a fan favorite when he joined the team in 1992.
During an August 24, 1983 game, Baltimore Orioles pitcher Tippy Martinez picked off three Toronto Blue Jays baserunners in one inning. The baserunners were Barry Bonnell, Dave Collins and Willie Upshaw.

Opening Day starters
 Dave Collins
 Dámaso García
 Jim Gott
 Alfredo Griffin
 Cliff Johnson
 Lloyd Moseby
 Rance Mulliniks
 Hosken Powell
 Willie Upshaw
 Ernie Whitt

Season standings

Record vs. opponents

Notable transactions
February 5, 1983: Leon Roberts was traded by the Blue Jays to the Kansas City Royals for Cecil Fielder.
June 6, 1983: Webster Garrison was drafted by the Blue Jays in the 2nd round of the 1983 amateur draft. Player signed August 21, 1983.
June 21, 1983: Doyle Alexander was signed as a free agent by the Blue Jays.

Roster

Game log

|- align="center" bgcolor="bbffbb"
| 1 || April 5 || @ Red Sox || 7 – 1 || Stieb (1-0) || Eckersley (0-1) || Jackson (1) || 33,852 || 1-0
|- align="center" bgcolor="ffbbbb"
| 2 || April 7 || @ Red Sox || 7 – 4 || Stanley (1-0) || Leal (0-1) || || 9,603 || 1-1
|- align="center" bgcolor="bbffbb"
| 3 || April 9 || Yankees || 7 – 4 || Jackson (1-0) || Gossage (0-1) || || 36,459 || 2-1
|- align="center" bgcolor="ffbbbb"
| 4 || April 10 || Yankees || 3 – 0 || Rawley (1-0) || Stieb (1-1) || || 23,093 || 2-2
|- align="center" bgcolor="ffbbbb"
| 5 || April 12 || Brewers || 6 – 5 || Sutton (1-1) || Morgan (0-1) || Easterly (1) || 11,413 || 2-3
|- align="center" bgcolor="bbffbb"
| 6 || April 13 || Brewers || 7 – 2 || Clancy (1-0) || Caldwell (0-2) || || 10,809 || 3-3
|- align="center" bgcolor="ffbbbb"
| 7 || April 14 || Brewers || 5 – 4 || Slaton (1-0) || McLaughlin (0-1) || || 10,127 || 3-4
|- align="center" bgcolor="bbffbb"
| 8 || April 15 || @ Yankees || 6 – 5 || Stieb (2-1) || May (0-1) || || 15,092 || 4-4
|- align="center" bgcolor="bbbbbb"
| -- || April 16 || @ Yankees || colspan=6|Postponed (rain) Rescheduled for August 8
|- align="center" bgcolor="ffbbbb"
| 9 || April 17 || @ Yankees || 7 – 5 || Rawley (2-0) || Clancy (1-1) || || 50,200 || 4-5
|- align="center" bgcolor="ffbbbb"
| 10 || April 18 || @ Yankees || 3 – 0 || Guidry (1-1) || Leal (0-2) || || 11,148 || 4-6
|- align="center" bgcolor="bbffbb"
| 11 || April 19 || Indians || 9 – 7 || Moffitt (1-0) || Spillner (0-1) || || 10,358 || 5-6
|- align="center" bgcolor="bbffbb"
| 12 || April 20 || Indians || 4 – 1 || Stieb (3-1) || Sorensen (0-3) || || 10,173 || 6-6
|- align="center" bgcolor="ffbbbb"
| 13 || April 22 || @ Royals || 6 – 5 || Leonard (2-1) || Jackson (1-1) || Quisenberry (4) || 16,172 || 6-7
|- align="center" bgcolor="bbffbb"
| 14 || April 23 || @ Royals || 5 – 4 || Moffitt (2-0) || Quisenberry (1-1) || McLaughlin (1) || 19,906 || 7-7
|- align="center" bgcolor="ffbbbb"
| 15 || April 24 || @ Royals || 7 – 1 || Renko (1-1) || Gott (0-1) || || 18,522 || 7-8
|- align="center" bgcolor="ffbbbb"
| 16 || April 26 || @ Rangers || 2 – 1 || Smithson (3-0) || Stieb (3-2) || || 17,380 || 7-9
|- align="center" bgcolor="bbffbb"
| 17 || April 27 || @ Rangers || 3 – 2 || Moffitt (3-0) || Darwin (1-2) || || 7,518 || 8-9
|- align="center" bgcolor="ffbbbb"
| 18 || April 29 || White Sox || 9 – 3 || Dotson (3-1) || Leal (0-3) || Tidrow (2) || 13,212 || 8-10
|- align="center" bgcolor="bbbbbb"
| -- || April 30 || White Sox || colspan=6|Postponed (rain) Rescheduled for July 26
|-

|- align="center" bgcolor="bbffbb"
| 19 || May 1 || White Sox || 8 – 0 || Stieb (4-2) || Bannister (1-4) || || 18,769 || 9-10
|- align="center" bgcolor="bbffbb"
| 20 || May 2 || Rangers || 6 – 5 || Clancy (2-1) || Darwin (1-3) || Moffitt (1) || 10,525 || 10-10
|- align="center" bgcolor="ffbbbb"
| 21 || May 3 || Rangers || 7 – 2 || Matlack (2-1) || Gott (0-2) || Tobik (3) || 10,125 || 10-11
|- align="center" bgcolor="bbffbb"
| 22 || May 4 || Rangers || 7 – 1 || Leal (1-3) || Honeycutt (3-2) || || 11,280 || 11-11
|- align="center" bgcolor="bbffbb"
| 23 || May 6 || Royals || 6 – 1 || Stieb (5-2) || Gura (4-2) || || 12,699 || 12-11
|- align="center" bgcolor="bbffbb"
| 24 || May 7 || Royals || 7 – 4 || Jackson (2-1) || Leonard (3-3) || Moffitt (2) || 15,527 || 13-11
|- align="center" bgcolor="ffbbbb"
| 25 || May 8 || Royals || 6 – 1 || Renko (2-2) || Gott (0-3) || Quisenberry (7) || 25,753 || 13-12
|- align="center" bgcolor="bbffbb"
| 26 || May 9 || @ White Sox || 6 – 1 || Leal (2-3) || Burns (0-1) || || 9,848 || 14-12
|- align="center" bgcolor="bbffbb"
| 27 || May 11 || @ White Sox || 3 – 1 (10)|| Stieb (6-2) || Hoyt (2-5) || || 18,844 || 15-12
|- align="center" bgcolor="bbffbb"
| 28 || May 12 || @ Indians || 6 – 3 || Clancy (3-1) || Sorensen (2-5) || Moffitt (3) || 6,361 || 16-12
|- align="center" bgcolor="ffbbbb"
| 29 || May 13 || @ Indians || 5 – 1 || Eichelberger (1-1) || Morgan (0-2) || || 10,900 || 16-13
|- align="center" bgcolor="bbffbb"
| 30 || May 14 || @ Indians || 8 – 1 || Leal (3-3) || Blyleven (3-4) || Jackson (2) || 15,505 || 17-13
|- align="center" bgcolor="bbbbbb"
| -- || May 15 || @ Indians || colspan=6|Postponed (rain) Rescheduled for August 16
|- align="center" bgcolor="bbffbb"
| 31 || May 16 || @ Brewers || 2 – 1 (11)|| Stieb (7-2) || McClure (1-6) || Moffitt (4) || 8,298 || 18-13
|- align="center" bgcolor="ffbbbb"
| 32 || May 17 || @ Brewers || 9 – 6 || Caldwell (3-4) || Clancy (3-2) || Tellmann (2) || 9,304 || 18-14
|- align="center" bgcolor="ffbbbb"
| 33 || May 18 || @ Brewers || 7 – 6 || Slaton (5-0) || Geisel (0-1) || || 16,485 || 18-15
|- align="center" bgcolor="ffbbbb"
| 34 || May 19 || Orioles || 2 – 1 || McGregor (4-2) || Morgan (0-3) || Martinez (4) || 11,569 || 18-16
|- align="center" bgcolor="bbffbb"
| 35 || May 20 || Orioles || 7 – 5 || Gott (1-3) || Martínez (3-7) || McLaughlin (2) || 16,034 || 19-16
|- align="center" bgcolor="bbffbb"
| 36 || May 21 || Orioles || 6 – 0 || Stieb (8-2) || Stewart (2-2) || || 20,165 || 20-16
|- align="center" bgcolor="bbffbb"
| 37 || May 22 || Orioles || 5 – 0 || Clancy (4-2) || Boddicker (1-1) || || 15,222 || 21-16
|- align="center" bgcolor="bbffbb"
| 38 || May 23 || Tigers || 4 – 0 || Leal (4-3) || Wilcox (4-5) || Moffitt (5) || 35,011 || 22-16
|- align="center" bgcolor="bbffbb"
| 39 || May 24 || Tigers || 7 – 6 || Jackson (3-1) || Rucker (1-2) || McLaughlin (3) || 19,105 || 23-16
|- align="center" bgcolor="ffbbbb"
| 40 || May 25 || Tigers || 6 – 2 || Petry (5-2) || Gott (1-4) || López (5) || 15,846 || 23-17
|- align="center" bgcolor="ffbbbb"
| 41 || May 26 || Red Sox || 7 – 2 || Stanley (4-2) || Stieb (8-3) || || 16,589 || 23-18
|- align="center" bgcolor="ffbbbb"
| 42 || May 27 || Red Sox || 2 – 0 || Tudor (3-2) || Clancy (4-3) || || 17,161 || 23-19
|- align="center" bgcolor="bbffbb"
| 43 || May 28 || Red Sox || 9 – 5 || Jackson (4-1) || Aponte (3-3) || McLaughlin (4) || 30,171 || 24-19
|- align="center" bgcolor="bbffbb"
| 44 || May 29 || Red Sox || 6 – 1 (6) || Gott (2-4) || Eckersley (3-2) || || 33,352 || 25-19
|- align="center" bgcolor="bbbbbb"
| -- || May 29 || Red Sox || colspan=6|Postponed (rain) Rescheduled for August 29
|- align="center" bgcolor="bbffbb"
| 45 || May 30 || @ Tigers || 6 – 4 (10)|| McLaughlin (1-1) || Gumpert (0-1) || || 10,901 || 26-19
|-

|- align="center" bgcolor="ffbbbb"
| 46 || June 1 || @ Tigers || 3 – 1 || Rozema (2-0) || Clancy (4-4) || López (7) || 9,586 || 26-20
|- align="center" bgcolor="bbffbb"
| 47 || June 2 || @ Tigers || 6 – 1 || Leal (5-3) || Wilcox (5-6) || || 11,907 || 27-20
|- align="center" bgcolor="ffbbbb"
| 48 || June 3 || @ Orioles || 3 – 2 || Martinez (3-1) || McLaughlin (1-2) || || 40,393 || 27-21
|- align="center" bgcolor="ffbbbb"
| 49 || June 4 || @ Orioles || 6 – 4 || Boddicker (3-2) || Stieb (8-4) || Stewart (2) || 22,659 || 27-22
|- align="center" bgcolor="bbffbb"
| 50 || June 5 || @ Orioles || 5 – 2 || Clancy (5-4) || Davis (3-3) || McLaughlin (5) || 20,953 || 28-22
|- align="center" bgcolor="ffbbbb"
| 51 || June 6 || @ Orioles || 8 – 1 (6) || McGregor (7-3) || Leal (5-4) || || 16,649 || 28-23
|- align="center" bgcolor="ffbbbb"
| 52 || June 7 || @ Athletics || 5 – 3 || Conroy (1-1) || Gott (2-5) || Baker (3) || 8,353 || 28-24
|- align="center" bgcolor="bbffbb"
| 53 || June 8 || @ Athletics || 5 – 2 || Stieb (9-4) || Codiroli (4-5) || McLaughlin (6) || 11,229 || 29-24
|- align="center" bgcolor="ffbbbb"
| 54 || June 9 || @ Athletics || 3 – 1 || Underwood (4-2) || Clancy (5-5) || Baker (4) || 6,846 || 29-25
|- align="center" bgcolor="ffbbbb"
| 55 || June 10 || @ Angels || 5 – 3 || Brown (1-0) || Leal (5-5) || || 32,751 || 29-26
|- align="center" bgcolor="bbffbb"
| 56 || June 11 || @ Angels || 3 – 2 || Gott (3-5) || Goltz (0-5) || Moffitt (6) || 45,393 || 30-26
|- align="center" bgcolor="bbffbb"
| 57 || June 12 || @ Angels || 6 – 5 (15)|| Clarke (1-0) || Brown (1-1) || Geisel (1) || 32,587 || 31-26
|- align="center" bgcolor="bbffbb"
| 58 || June 14 || Athletics || 13 – 7 || Jackson (5-1) || Underwood (4-3) || || 20,189 || 32-26
|- align="center" bgcolor="ffbbbb"
| 59 || June 15 || Athletics || 10 – 1 || Krueger (5-5) || Leal (5-6) || || 20,039 || 32-27
|- align="center" bgcolor="bbffbb"
| 60 || June 16 || Athletics || 9 – 1 || Gott (4-5) || McCatty (1-1) || || 18,186 || 33-27
|- align="center" bgcolor="bbffbb"
| 61 || June 17 || Angels || 6 – 3 || Stieb (10-4) || Travers (0-2) || || 31,586 || 34-27
|- align="center" bgcolor="ffbbbb"
| 62 || June 18 || Angels || 7 – 6 || Sánchez (7-2) || Clarke (1-1) || || 40,150 || 34-28
|- align="center" bgcolor="bbffbb"
| 63 || June 19 || Angels || 6 – 1 || Leal (6-6) || Goltz (0-6) || || 36,098 || 35-28
|- align="center" bgcolor="bbffbb"
| 64 || June 20 || Twins || 2 – 1 || Gott (5-5) || Davis (2-3) || || 19,267 || 36-28
|- align="center" bgcolor="bbffbb"
| 65 || June 21 || Twins || 8 – 3 || Acker (1-0) || Oelkers (0-4) || || 23,473 || 37-28
|- align="center" bgcolor="ffbbbb"
| 66 || June 22 || Twins || 4 – 3 || Schrom (5-2) || Stieb (10-5) || Davis (10) || 26,452 || 37-29
|- align="center" bgcolor="bbffbb"
| 67 || June 23 || @ Mariners || 5 – 4 || Clancy (6-5) || Stanton (0-1) || McLaughlin (7) || 6,303 || 38-29
|- align="center" bgcolor="bbffbb"
| 68 || June 24 || @ Mariners || 4 – 2 || Leal (7-6) || Young (7-7) || || 6,389 || 39-29
|- align="center" bgcolor="ffbbbb"
| 69 || June 25 || @ Mariners || 5 – 2 || Beattie (5-5) || Gott (5-6) || Caudill (14) || 15,048 || 39-30
|- align="center" bgcolor="bbffbb"
| 70 || June 26 || @ Mariners || 19 – 7 || Acker (2-0) || Stoddard (4-10) || || 6,593 || 40-30
|- align="center" bgcolor="ffbbbb"
| 71 || June 28 || @ Twins || 5 – 2 || Schrom (6-2) || Stieb (10-6) || Davis (11) || 12,844 || 40-31
|- align="center" bgcolor="bbffbb"
| 72 || June 29 || @ Twins || 4 – 2 || Clancy (7-5) || Castillo (4-6) || || 8,242 || 41-31
|- align="center" bgcolor="bbffbb"
| 73 || June 30 || @ Twins || 11 – 3 || Leal (8-6) || Williams (4-9) || || 20,498 || 42-31
|-

|- align="center" bgcolor="ffbbbb"
| 74 || July 1 || Mariners || 11 – 2 || Beattie (6-5) || Gott (5-7) || || 36,572 || 42-32
|- align="center" bgcolor="bbffbb"
| 75 || July 2 || Mariners || 7 – 6 || Jackson (6-1) || Caudill (1-5) || || 21,783 || 43-32
|- align="center" bgcolor="ffbbbb"
| 76 || July 3 || Mariners || 4 – 1 || Abbott (3-0) || Stieb (10-7) || || 32,161 || 43-33
|- align="center" bgcolor="bbbbbb"
| -- || July 4 || Mariners || colspan=6|Postponed (rain) Rescheduled for September 19
|- align="center" bgcolor="bbffbb"
| 77 || July 8 || Rangers || 8 – 5 || Clancy (8-5) || Darwin (7-7) || Moffitt (7) || 25,666 || 44-33
|- align="center" bgcolor="bbffbb"
| 78 || July 9 || Rangers || 5 – 1 || Leal (9-6) || Hough (7-7) || || 26,234 || 45-33
|- align="center" bgcolor="bbffbb"
| 79 || July 10 || Rangers || 6 – 4 || Stieb (11-7) || Honeycutt (11-5) || Moffitt (8) || 32,071 || 46-33
|- align="center" bgcolor="bbffbb"
| 80 || July 11 || @ Royals || 7 – 4 (11)|| Moffitt (4-0) || Creel (0-4) || || 32,415 || 47-33
|- align="center" bgcolor="bbffbb"
| 81 || July 12 || @ Royals || 9 – 6 || Jackson (7-1) || Renko (5-7) || || 22,266 || 48-33
|- align="center" bgcolor="ffbbbb"
| 82 || July 13 || @ Royals || 5 – 4 || Gura (8-10) || Clancy (8-6) || Quisenberry (21) || 32,352 || 48-34
|- align="center" bgcolor="bbffbb"
| 83 || July 14 || @ White Sox || 8 – 0 || Leal (10-6) || Koosman (7-2) || || 17,883 || 49-34
|- align="center" bgcolor="bbffbb"
| 84 || July 15 || @ White Sox || 3 – 2 || McLaughlin (2-2) || Dotson (8-6) || || 28,288 || 50-34
|- align="center" bgcolor="bbffbb"
| 85 || July 16 || @ White Sox || 7 – 5 || McLaughlin (3-2) || Agosto (1-1) || Moffitt (9) || 34,243 || 51-34
|- align="center" bgcolor="ffbbbb"
| 86 || July 17 || @ White Sox || 3 – 2 || Bannister (5-9) || Alexander (0-3) || Lamp (2) || 30,140 || 51-35
|- align="center" bgcolor="bbffbb"
| 87 || July 18 || Royals || 8 – 2 || Clancy (9-6) || Gura (8-11) || || 26,178 || 52-35
|- align="center" bgcolor="ffbbbb"
| 88 || July 19 || Royals || 6 – 2 || Black (4-3) || Leal (10-7) || Quisenberry (22) || 36,459 || 52-36
|- align="center" bgcolor="ffbbbb"
| 89 || July 20 || Royals || 14 – 8 || Splittorff (8-3) || Stieb (11-8) || Quisenberry (23) || 30,658 || 52-37
|- align="center" bgcolor="ffbbbb"
| 90 || July 21 || @ Rangers || 3 – 2 || Tanana (4-2) || Gott (5-8) || || 18,323 || 52-38
|- align="center" bgcolor="bbffbb"
| 91 || July 22 || @ Rangers || 10 – 5 (11)|| Moffitt (5-0) || Schmidt (2-1) || || 28,075 || 53-38
|- align="center" bgcolor="bbffbb"
| 92 || July 23 || @ Rangers || 3 – 2 || Clancy (10-6) || Darwin (7-10) || || 43,705 || 54-38
|- align="center" bgcolor="ffbbbb"
| 93 || July 24 || @ Rangers || 3 – 0 || Honeycutt (13-6) || Leal (10-8) || || 30,123 || 54-39
|- align="center" bgcolor="ffbbbb"
| 94 || July 25 || White Sox || 7 – 4 || Dotson (10-6) || Stieb (11-9) || Lamp (4) || 24,394 || 54-40
|- align="center" bgcolor="bbffbb"
| 95 || July 26 || White Sox || 6 – 4 || Gott (6-8) || Burns (5-6) || McLaughlin (8) || || 55-40
|- align="center" bgcolor="ffbbbb"
| 96 || July 26 || White Sox || 4 – 3 || Bannister (7-9) || Alexander (0-4) || Lamp (5) || 33,554 || 55-41
|- align="center" bgcolor="ffbbbb"
| 97 || July 27 || White Sox || 11 – 3 || Hoyt (12-10) || Leal (10-9) || || 36,012 || 55-42
|- align="center" bgcolor="bbffbb"
| 98 || July 29 || Indians || 4 – 2 || Clancy (11-6) || Sutcliffe (12-6) || || 18,020 || 56-42
|- align="center" bgcolor="bbffbb"
| 99 || July 30 || Indians || 6 – 5 (13)|| McLaughlin (4-2) || Anderson (0-2) || || 23,445 || 57-42
|- align="center" bgcolor="ffbbbb"
| 100 || July 31 || Indians || 16 – 11 || Eichelberger (4-10) || Acker (2-1) || Anderson (2) || 22,498 || 57-43
|-

|- align="center" bgcolor="ffbbbb"
| 101 || August 1 || Indians || 6 – 0 || Barker (8-11) || Alexander (0-5) || || 20,781 || 57-44
|- align="center" bgcolor="bbffbb"
| 102 || August 2 || Yankees || 10 – 9 (10)|| Jackson (8-1) || Murray (2-2) || || || 58-44
|- align="center" bgcolor="bbffbb"
| 103 || August 2 || Yankees || 13 – 6 || Williams (1-0) || Shirley (3-6) || Geisel (2) || 45,102 || 59-44
|- align="center" bgcolor="bbffbb"
| 104 || August 3 || Yankees || 6 – 2 || Clancy (12-6) || Guidry (12-7) || || 35,589 || 60-44
|- align="center" bgcolor="ffbbbb"
| 105 || August 4 || Yankees || 3 – 1 || Rawley (10-9) || Stieb (11-10) || || 36,684 || 60-45
|- align="center" bgcolor="ffbbbb"
| 106 || August 5 || @ Brewers || 7 – 0 || Haas (9-2) || Gott (6-9) || || 29,559 || 60-46
|- align="center" bgcolor="ffbbbb"
| 107 || August 6 || @ Brewers || 3 – 0 || Porter (4-5) || Alexander (0-6) || || 48,464 || 60-47
|- align="center" bgcolor="ffbbbb"
| 108 || August 7 || @ Brewers || 9 – 6 || Caldwell (9-8) || Leal (10-10) || Ladd (11) || 47,300 || 60-48
|- align="center" bgcolor="ffbbbb"
| 109 || August 8 || @ Yankees || 8 – 3 || Guidry (13-7) || Clancy (12-7) || || || 60-49
|- align="center" bgcolor="ffbbbb"
| 110 || August 8 || @ Yankees || 11 – 3 || Shirley (4-6) || Williams (1-1) || Frazier (4) || 40,598 || 60-50
|- align="center" bgcolor="bbffbb"
| 111 || August 9 || @ Yankees || 8 – 0 || Stieb (12-10) || Rawley (10-10) || || 35,221 || 61-50
|- align="center" bgcolor="ffbbbb"
| 112 || August 10 || @ Yankees || 8 – 3 || Righetti (13-3) || Gott (6-10) || || 40,377 || 61-51
|- align="center" bgcolor="ffbbbb"
| 113 || August 11 || Brewers || 6 – 4 || Porter (5-5) || Alexander (0-7) || Ladd (13) || 27,620 || 61-52
|- align="center" bgcolor="bbffbb"
| 114 || August 12 || Brewers || 5 – 4 || McLaughlin (5-2) || Slaton (9-5) || || 30,130 || 62-52
|- align="center" bgcolor="bbffbb"
| 115 || August 13 || Brewers || 3 – 1 || Clancy (13-7) || McClure (9-9) || Geisel (3) || 35,240 || 63-52
|- align="center" bgcolor="bbffbb"
| 116 || August 14 || Brewers || 4 – 3 || Stieb (13-10) || Ladd (3-3) || McLaughlin (9) || 42,240 || 64-52
|- align="center" bgcolor="bbffbb"
| 117 || August 15 || @ Indians || 3 – 2 || Moffitt (6-0) || Spillner (1-8) || || 6,675 || 65-52
|- align="center" bgcolor="ffbbbb"
| 118 || August 16 || @ Indians || 3 – 2 || Easterly (2-1) || Moffitt (6-1) || || || 65-53
|- align="center" bgcolor="bbffbb"
| 119 || August 16 || @ Indians || 9 – 6 || McLaughlin (6-2) || Anderson (0-4) || || 9,666 || 66-53
|- align="center" bgcolor="bbffbb"
| 120 || August 17 || @ Indians || 6 – 5 (10)|| McLaughlin (7-2) || Sutcliffe (13-9) || Jackson (3) || 6,239 || 67-53
|- align="center" bgcolor="bbffbb"
| 121 || August 19 || @ Red Sox || 8 – 7 || Acker (3-1) || Clear (3-5) || Jackson (4) || 27,386 || 68-53
|- align="center" bgcolor="ffbbbb"
| 122 || August 20 || @ Red Sox || 5 – 2 || Eckersley (7-9) || Stieb (13-11) || Stanley (23) || 29,173 || 68-54
|- align="center" bgcolor="bbffbb"
| 123 || August 21 || @ Red Sox || 7 – 3 || Gott (7-10) || Hurst (9-10) || || 31,159 || 69-54
|- align="center" bgcolor="ffbbbb"
| 124 || August 22 || @ Red Sox || 4 – 2 || Ojeda (6-6) || Alexander (0-8) || Stanley (24) || 26,351 || 69-55
|- align="center" bgcolor="bbffbb"
| 125 || August 23 || @ Orioles || 9 – 3 || Leal (11-10) || Flanagan (7-3) || || 47,387 || 70-55
|- align="center" bgcolor="ffbbbb"
| 126 || August 24 || @ Orioles || 7 – 4 (10)|| Martinez (7-3) || McLaughlin (7-3) || || 25,882 || 70-56
|- align="center" bgcolor="ffbbbb"
| 127 || August 25 || @ Orioles || 2 – 1 (10)|| Martinez (8-3) || Jackson (8-2) || || 28,615 || 70-57
|- align="center" bgcolor="ffbbbb"
| 128 || August 26 || @ Tigers || 4 – 3 (10)|| López (8-5) || Gott (7-11) || || 46,467 || 70-58
|- align="center" bgcolor="bbffbb"
| 129 || August 27 || @ Tigers || 7 – 4 || Alexander (1-8) || López (8-6) || Geisel (4) || 39,118 || 71-58
|- align="center" bgcolor="ffbbbb"
| 130 || August 28 || @ Tigers || 4 – 2 || Morris (17-8) || McLaughlin (7-4) || || 38,332 || 71-59
|- align="center" bgcolor="bbffbb"
| 131 || August 29 || Red Sox || 5 – 1 || Clancy (14-7) || Tudor (10-9) || || || 72-59
|- align="center" bgcolor="ffbbbb"
| 132 || August 29 || Red Sox || 8 – 7 || Clear (4-5) || Moffitt (6-2) || Stanley (26) || 38,338 || 72-60
|- align="center" bgcolor="ffbbbb"
| 133 || August 30 || Red Sox || 5 – 4 (12)|| Johnson (3-2) || Jackson (8-3) || Clear (4) || 30,827 || 72-61
|- align="center" bgcolor="ffbbbb"
| 134 || August 31 || Orioles || 10 – 2 || Boddicker (12-6) || Gott (7-12) || || 37,127 || 72-62
|-

|- align="center" bgcolor="bbffbb"
| 135 || September 1 || Orioles || 5 – 3 || Alexander (2-8) || Palmer (3-4) || || 30,062 || 73-62
|- align="center" bgcolor="ffbbbb"
| 136 || September 2 || Tigers || 9 – 8 (10)|| López (9-7) || Gott (7-13) || || || 73-63
|- align="center" bgcolor="bbffbb"
| 137 || September 2 || Tigers || 8 – 7 || Acker (4-1) || Wilcox (8-9) || Geisel (5) || 41,667 || 74-63
|- align="center" bgcolor="ffbbbb"
| 138 || September 3 || Tigers || 7 – 4 || Petry (15-8) || Clancy (14-8) || Martin (1) || 35,268 || 74-64
|- align="center" bgcolor="bbffbb"
| 139 || September 4 || Tigers || 6 – 3 (10)|| Stieb (14-11) || López (9-8) || || 43,158 || 75-64
|- align="center" bgcolor="bbffbb"
| 140 || September 5 || Angels || 7 – 0 || Gott (8-13) || Zahn (8-11) || || 24,741 || 76-64
|- align="center" bgcolor="bbffbb"
| 141 || September 6 || Angels || 6 – 4 || Alexander (3-8) || Curtis (1-2) || Acker (1) || 19,176 || 77-64
|- align="center" bgcolor="ffbbbb"
| 142 || September 7 || Angels || 9 – 6 || Sánchez (9-7) || Geisel (0-2) || || 22,639 || 77-65
|- align="center" bgcolor="ffbbbb"
| 143 || September 9 || Athletics || 7 – 5 || McCatty (6-7) || Clancy (14-9) || Atherton (3) || 20,336 || 77-66
|- align="center" bgcolor="bbffbb"
| 144 || September 10 || Athletics || 7 – 5 || Stieb (15-11) || Underwood (8-7) || Moffitt (10) || 26,434 || 78-66
|- align="center" bgcolor="bbffbb"
| 145 || September 11 || Athletics || 16 – 6 || Gott (9-13) || Codiroli (12-11) || || 38,439 || 79-66
|- align="center" bgcolor="bbffbb"
| 146 || September 13 || @ Mariners || 6 – 4 || Leal (12-10) || Stoddard (8-15) || Jackson (5) || 4,340 || 80-66
|- align="center" bgcolor="bbffbb"
| 147 || September 14 || @ Mariners || 4 – 3 || Alexander (4-8) || Thomas (3-1) || || 4,800 || 81-66
|- align="center" bgcolor="ffbbbb"
| 148 || September 15 || @ Twins || 6 – 2 || Schrom (13-7) || Stieb (15-12) || || 4,039 || 81-67
|- align="center" bgcolor="ffbbbb"
| 149 || September 16 || @ Twins || 11 – 4 || Lysander (5-12) || Gott (9-14) || || 11,640 || 81-68
|- align="center" bgcolor="bbffbb"
| 150 || September 17 || @ Twins || 13 – 3 || Leal (13-10) || Pettibone (0-2) || || 6,300 || 82-68
|- align="center" bgcolor="ffbbbb"
| 151 || September 19 || Mariners || 9 – 6 || Young (11-14) || Geisel (0-3) || Vande Berg (5) || 10,484 || 82-69
|- align="center" bgcolor="bbffbb"
| 152 || September 20 || Mariners || 7 – 3 || Stieb (16-12) || Moore (5-8) || || 15,657 || 83-69
|- align="center" bgcolor="bbffbb"
| 153 || September 21 || Mariners || 4 – 3 || Alexander (5-8) || Clark (7-9) || || 16,321 || 84-69
|- align="center" bgcolor="ffbbbb"
| 154 || September 23 || @ Athletics || 2 – 0 || Conroy (7-9) || Leal (13-11) || || 8,069 || 84-70
|- align="center" bgcolor="ffbbbb"
| 155 || September 24 || @ Athletics || 2 – 1 (10)|| Warren (4-3) || Clancy (14-10) || || 11,732 || 84-71
|- align="center" bgcolor="bbffbb"
| 156 || September 25 || @ Athletics || 8 – 6 || Acker (5-1) || Atherton (2-5) || || 14,650 || 85-71
|- align="center" bgcolor="bbffbb"
| 157 || September 26 || @ Angels || 3 – 2 (10)|| Alexander (6-8) || Lacey (0-2) || Jackson (6) || 19,713 || 86-71
|- align="center" bgcolor="ffbbbb"
| 158 || September 27 || @ Angels || 7 – 1 || McLaughlin (2-4) || Leal (13-12) || Curtis (4) || 20,559 || 86-72
|- align="center" bgcolor="bbffbb"
| 159 || September 28 || @ Angels || 5 – 3 || Clancy (15-10) || Witt (7-14) || Jackson (7) || 20,592 || 87-72
|- align="center" bgcolor="bbffbb"
| 160 || September 30 || Twins || 8 – 0 || Stieb (17-12) || Viola (7-15) || || 18,501 || 88-72
|-

|- align="center" bgcolor="bbffbb"
| 161 || October 1 || Twins || 4 – 3 || Alexander (7-8) || Pettibone (0-4) || || 25,332 || 89-72
|- align="center" bgcolor="ffbbbb"
| 162 || October 2 || Twins || 9 – 3 || Williams (11-14) || Clancy (15-11) || || 40,692 || 89-73
|-

Player stats

Batting

Starters by position
Note: Pos = Position; G = Games played; AB = At bats; R = Runs scored; H = Hits; 2B = Doubles; 3B = Triples; Avg. = Batting average; HR = Home runs; RBI = Runs batted in; SB = Stolen bases

Other batters
Note: G = Games played; AB = At bats; R = Runs scored; H = Hits; 2B = Doubles; 3B = Triples; Avg. = Batting average; HR = Home runs; RBI = Runs batted in; SB = Stolen bases

Pitching

Starting pitchers
Note: G = Games pitched; GS = Games started; IP = Innings pitched; W = Wins; L = Losses; ERA = Earned run average; R = Runs allowed; ER = Earned runs allowed; BB = Walks allowed; K = Strikeouts

Other pitchers
Note: G = Games pitched; GS = Games started; IP = Innings pitched; W = Wins; L = Losses; SV = Saves; ERA = Earned run average; R = Runs allowed; ER = Earned runs allowed; BB = Walks allowed; K = Strikeouts

Relief pitchers
Note: G = Games pitched; IP = Innings pitched;  W = Wins; L = Losses; SV = Saves;  ERA = Earned run average;  R = Runs allowed; ER = Earned runs allowed; BB = Walks allowed; K = Strikeouts

Award winners
Lloyd Moseby, Player of the Month Award, August
 Lloyd Moseby, Silver Slugger Award
Dave Stieb, Pitcher of the Month Award, May

All-Star Game
Dave Stieb, Starting Pitcher

Farm system

Notes

External links
1983 Toronto Blue Jays at Baseball Reference
1983 Toronto Blue Jays at Baseball Almanac

Toronto Blue Jays seasons
Toronto Blue Jays season
1983 in Canadian sports
1983 in Toronto